Movement for Democracy can refer to three political parties:
Movement for Democracy (Cape Verde)
Movement for Democracy (Slovakia)
Movement for Democracy – The Network, Italy

See also
Democratic Movement (disambiguation)
Movement for Democracy and Independence
Movement for Democracy and Development (disambiguation)